Saivapragasa Ladies' College ( Caivap Pirakāca Makaḷir Kallūri, also known as Saivapragasa Girls' College) is a provincial school in Vavuniya, Sri Lanka.

See also
 List of schools in Northern Province, Sri Lanka

References

External links
 Saivapragasa Ladies' College

Girls' schools in Sri Lanka
Provincial schools in Sri Lanka
Schools in Vavuniya